Pelargoderus salomonum is a species of beetle in the family Cerambycidae. It was described by Stephan von Breuning in 1962. It is known from Papua New Guinea.

References

salomonum
Beetles described in 1962